Abdallah Muhammed at-Tom was a Sudanese politician. He was a sheikh of the Arakiyin. He was a substantial tenant farmer on the Gezira scheme. In the 1953 legislative election he was elected to the House of Representatives from Wad Madani as a National Unionist Party candidate.

References

Members of the Sudanese House of Representatives, elected in 1953